is a Japanese footballer currently playing as a midfielder for Fagiano Okayama.

Career statistics

Club
.

Notes

References

External links

1998 births
Living people
Association football people from Yamaguchi Prefecture
Osaka University of Health and Sport Sciences alumni
Japanese footballers
Association football midfielders
J2 League players
Fagiano Okayama players